The slender bamboo shark, Chiloscyllium indicum, is a bamboo shark in the family Hemiscylliidae found in the Indo-West Pacific Oceans between latitudes 40° N and 10° S, and longitude 65° E and 160° E. It is harmless to humans.

Description 
The mouth is located in front of the eyes. It has an elongated slender precaudal tail. The body is brownish with a number of dark spots and dashes. Its dorsal fins are round, the same size, and smaller than the pelvic fin.

Habitat 
This species is an inshore bottom dweller. It can be found on sandy and muddy bottoms of coastal waters. It probably feeds on small bottom dwelling invertebrates.

Reproduction 
These sharks are oviparous (egg laying).

See also

 List of sharks
 Carpet shark

References

 
 Compagno, Dando, & Fowler, Sharks of the World, Princeton University Press, New Jersey 2005 

slender bamboo shark
Marine fauna of East Asia
Marine fauna of South Asia
Marine fauna of Southeast Asia
slender bamboo shark
slender bamboo shark